The 2016 Trans-Tasman Trophy was a field hockey tournament contested by men's and women's field hockey teams from Australia and New Zealand. The tournament was held in the New Zealand city of Auckland, at the Lloyd Elsmore Hockey Stadium.

At the conclusion of the tournament, results from the men's and women's tournament were combined to determine the winning country. Australia won the 2016 Trans-Tasman Trophy, after defeating New Zealand on aggregate scores.

Results

Men's Competition

Women's Competition

Statistics

Final standings
Results from the men's and women's competitions were combined to determine the champions.

Goalscorers

Men
2 Goals

 Jeremy Hayward
 Stephen Jenness
 Kim Kingstone

1 Goal

 Chris Bausor
 Daniel Beale
 Aaron Kleinschmidt
 Trent Mitton
 Aran Zalewski
 Sam Lane

Women
2 Goals

 Georgina Morgan
 Kathryn Slattery
 Olivia Merry

1 Goal

 Kalindi Commerford
 Ashlea Fey
 Georgia Nanscawen
 Brooke Peris
 Samantha Harrison
 Rachel McCann
 Kirsten Pearce

References

International field hockey competitions hosted by New Zealand
International women's field hockey competitions hosted by New Zealand
Trans-Tasman Trophy
Trans-Tasman Trophy
Trans-Tasman Trophy
Trans-Tasman Trophy
Trans-Tasman Trophy
Trans-Tasman Trophy
November 2016 sports events in New Zealand